Psalm 108 is the 108th psalm in the Book of Psalms. The first verse attributes it to King David, the author of many Psalms. It is a hymn, beginning in English in the King James Version: "O God, my heart is fixed; I will sing and give praise, even with my glory". In Latin, it is known as "Paratum cor meum Deus". In the slightly different numbering system used in the Greek Septuagint version of the bible, and in the Latin Vulgate, this psalm is Psalm 107.

The psalm forms a regular part of Jewish, Catholic, Lutheran, Anglican and other Protestant liturgies. It has been paraphrased in hymns, and has often been set to music.

Structure and themes 
Psalm 108 contains numerous verses which appear in other psalms. Verses 1–5 are similar to Psalm 57:7–11, with slight variation, while verses 7–13 are similar to Psalm 60:5–12. William Barrick considers this psalm to be the "borrower". John Paul II said that the fusion of Psalms 57 and 60 with Psalm 108 shows that "Israel, already in the Old Testament, was re-using and bringing up-to-date the Word of God revealed".

Charles Spurgeon called Psalm 108 "The Warrior's Morning Song, with which he adores his God and strengthens his heart before entering upon the conflicts of the day". He notes that in Psalm 57, verses 7-11 follow on from prayer "and grow out of it", whereas here they initiate the psalm: "the psalmist begins at once to sing and give praise, and afterwards prays to God in a remarkably confident manner".

Matthew Henry calls it "an assurance of God's answer and salvation".

Text

Hebrew Bible version 
Following is the Hebrew text of Psalm 108:

King James Version 
 O God, my heart is fixed; I will sing and give praise, even with my glory. 
 Awake, psaltery and harp: I myself will awake early. 
 I will praise thee, O , among the people: and I will sing praises unto thee among the nations. 
 For thy mercy is great above the heavens: and thy truth reacheth unto the clouds. 
 Be thou exalted, O God, above the heavens: and thy glory above all the earth; 
 That thy beloved may be delivered: save with thy right hand, and answer me. 
 God hath spoken in his holiness; I will rejoice, I will divide Shechem, and mete out the valley of Succoth. 
 Gilead is mine; Manasseh is mine; Ephraim also is the strength of mine head; Judah is my lawgiver; 
 Moab is my washpot; over Edom will I cast out my shoe; over Philistia will I triumph. 
 Who will bring me into the strong city? who will lead me into Edom? 
 Wilt not thou, O God, who hast cast us off? and wilt not thou, O God, go forth with our hosts? 
 Give us help from trouble: for vain is the help of man. 
 Through God we shall do valiantly: for he it is that shall tread down our enemies.

Verse 2
Awake, lute and harp!I will awaken the dawn.The Midrash teaches that this verse (verse 3 in Hebrew numbering) refers to David's practice of arising each night before dawn and praising God with psaltery and harp, thus "awakening the dawn".

 Uses 
 Judaism 
 Verse 5 is recited during Selichot.
 Verse 7 is part of the Elokai Netzor paragraph at the end of the Amidah. This verse is identical to verse 7 in Psalm 60.

 Catholic Church 
This is one of the psalms for which St. Benedict of Nursia did not specify the use, in the Rule of St. Benedict of 530AD. However, Psalm 108 was traditionally performed by his order for matins of Saturday, or according to another document of the founder or according to one of his successors, so that all 150 psalms are executed each Week.

In the Liturgy of Hours, Psalm 108 is read to the Office of Lauds of Wednesday of the fourth week.

 Protestant 
Psalm 108 has been set to music in the Anglican "Hymnal 1982", The United Methodist Hymnal, Psalter Hymnal (Gray) and the Baptist Hymnal (1991 version).

Music
Marc-Antoine Charpentier set around 1680 one " Paratum cor meum Deus",'' H.183, for 3 voices and continuo.

References

External links 

 
 
 Text of Psalm 108 according to the 1928 Psalter
 Psalms Chapter 108 text in Hebrew and English, mechon-mamre.org
 A song; a psalm of David. / My heart is steadfast, God; my heart is steadfast. United States Conference of Catholic Bishops
 Psalm 108:1 introduction and text, biblestudytools.com
 Psalm 108 – Praise and Trust from the Past for Today enduringword.com
 Psalm 108 / Refrain: Be exalted, O God, above the heavens. Church of England
 Psalm 108 at biblegateway.com

108
Works attributed to David
Philistia